Sigor Constituency is an electoral constituency in Kenya. It is one of four constituencies of West Pokot County. The constituency had 14 wards until 2010 when they were merged to form 4 wards while others formed the now Pokot south constituency., all electing Members of County Assembly for the West Pokot County Government. The constituency was established for the 1988 elections.

Members of Parliament

Wards

References 

Constituencies in West Pokot County
Constituencies in Rift Valley Province
1988 establishments in Kenya
Constituencies established in 1988